General Eyewear is a London-based eyewear company and brand. The company was founded in the late 1990s by Fraser Laing. Originally under the name Arckiv, it produced its own original eyewear designs and had a particular specialism in vintage eyewear. In 2010 the company split into two distinct companies, Arckiv became solely focused on menswear, while General Eyewear became a stand-alone company and brand formed from the continuation of the original eyewear division.

History

General Eyewear under the name Arckiv began as an eyewear specialist in the late 1990s, producing its own original designs but being notable for its extensive library of museum grade, antique, prototype and vintage frames, quickly becoming a renowned specialist in eyewear. The company eventually moved into the design of clothing and accessories. After splitting in 2010 to form two distinct companies, Arckiv became solely focused on menswear, while General Eyewear became a stand-alone company and brand formed from the continuation of the original eyewear division.

Flagship Store
General Eyewear has a flagship store, which is an independent opticians located in London's historic Stables Market which is where it holds its vast archive of frames. The store itself was named The Best Accessories Shop in London by Time Out London.

References

External links
GeneralEyewear.com
General Eyewear Facebook Page

Shops in London
British companies established in 1997
Manufacturing companies established in 1997
British brands
Eyewear brands of the United Kingdom
Companies based in the City of Westminster
English fashion designers
Fashion accessory brands
2000s fashion
2010s fashion
Eyewear companies of the United Kingdom